Shaikh Ilam-ud-din Ansari (died 1641), known by his royal title Wazir Khan, was a Mughal Governer of the 16th century. He was a native of Chiniot, Punjab whose family migrated to Lahore.

Career
He rose to be one of the court physicians to the Mughal Emperor Shah Jahan in Lahore, and was in due course, over a long lifetime of service, made a Mughal noble with the command of 7000. He remained Chief Qadi at Lahore for some time.

From 1628 to 1631 he served as the governor of Agra after which he was appointed as the governor of Lahore. He held this post until approximately 1640/1641, when he was reappointed as governor of Agra. In 1640, he became the Grand Vizier of the Mughal Empire and remained so til his death in 1642.

Sikh Accounts 
According to Sikh texts and tradition Wazir Khan was a supporter of the Sikh community and even a Sikh himself. Sikh tradition says he had been an admirer of Guru Arjan because of the parayer Sukhmani Sahib which is said to have given him relief. After which he had become a Sikh.Thus when Guru Arjan was to be executed by the Mughal Emperor he did everything he could to save the Guru, but it was in vain.

During the time of Guru Hargobind Wazir Khan kept his support of the Guru. When the Guru was arrested by the emperor Shah Jahan, Wazir Khan begged for the Guru's release.After the first battle between the Sikh and the Mughals Khan convinced Shah Jahan that there wasn't value in taking further action against the Guru. He said, "Sire, the Guru is not a rebel and hath no design on thine empire. He hath ever been the support of the state... Is it not a mircale that with not fully seven hundred men he destroyed an army of seven thousand." Hearing this the emperor was convinced to take no further action against the Guru.

Afterward Kahn continued to aid the Guru throughout his life.

Legacy
He is best known today for founding Wazirabad, a city near the river Chenab in Punjab, and building the famous Wazir Khan Mosque in Lahore. The title of 'Wazir Khan' by which he is remembered by posterity was granted him by Shah Jahan, and literally means a 'Wazir', or Vizier, a 'Minister/High Court Official'.

References 

Mughal nobility
People from Chiniot District
Year of birth missing
People from Lahore
Punjabi people
Subahdars of Lahore

1641 deaths